Parisina Malatesta was the wife of Niccolò III d'Este, who beheaded her with her lover and stepson Ugo d'Este. Her tragic story has inspired writers and musicians:
 Parisina, a 1816 poem by Byron
 Parisina (Donizetti) by Donizetti
 Parisina (Mascagni), opera by Mascagni after Gabriele D'Annunzio's libretto
 1878 opera by Tomás Giribaldi
 Tragedy by Antonio Somma

 La Parisina, a Mexican department store